A confession is an acknowledgement of fact by one who would have otherwise preferred to keep that fact hidden.

Confession may also refer to:

Law
 Confession (law), a statement by a suspect in crime which is adverse to that person

Religion 
 Confession (religion), the acknowledgment of one's sinfulness or wrongdoings
 Confession (Judaism)
 Confession (Lutheran Church)
 Sacrament of Penance, during which Catholics confess their sins
 Creed, also known as a confession of faith

Arts, entertainment, and media

Films 
 The Confession (1920 film), an American film directed by Bertram Bracken
 Confession (1929 film), an American film directed by Lionel Barrymore
 Confession (1937 film), an American remake of the 1935 German film Mazurka
 Confession (1955 film), a British film by Ken Hughes
 The Confession (1964 film), a film by William Dieterle
 The Confession (1970 film), a French-Italian film by Costa-Gavras
 The Confession (1999 film), an American drama starring Ben Kingsley
 The Confession (2002 film), a Turkish drama
 The Confession (2005 film), a film by Ash Baron-Cohen

 The Confession (2006 film), a film featuring Jessy Terrero
 The Confession (2010 film), a British short film by Tanel Toom
 Confession (2014 film), a South Korean film starring Ji Sung
 Confession (2015 film), a South Korean film starring Kim Young-ho
 The Confession (2013 film), a Hallmark Channel TV movie
 Confession (2022 film), a South Korean mystery thriller film

Literature 
 "Confession", a 12th-century Latin poem attributed to the Archpoet
 Confession (Bakunin), an 1851 autobiographical work by Mikhail Bakunin
 A Confession, an 1882 short work on religion by Leo Tolstoy
 The Confession (novel), a 2010 novel by John Grisham
 The Confession, a 2004 novel by Olen Steinhauer

Music

Bands
 Confession (band), an Australian hardcore/metalcore band
 The Confession (band), an American heavy metal music group

Albums
 Confession (Ill Niño album),  2003
 Confession (Pets Tseng album), 2019

Songs
 "Confession" (song), by Florida Georgia Line
 "Confession", by Collective Soul from See What You Started by Continuing
 "Confession", by Destroy All Monsters
 "Confession", by Gary Numan from Outland
 "Confession", by Samantha Fox from I Wanna Have Some Fun
 "Confession", by Toby Fox, a track from the soundtrack of the 2015 video game Undertale
 "Confession", by Uriah Heep from High and Mighty
 "Confession I", and "Confession II", by Shinhwa from Winter Story
 "The Confession", by Laura Nyro from Eli and the Thirteenth Confession

Television/web series

Series
 Confession (American TV series), a 1958–1959 American television series
 Confession (South Korean TV series), a 2019 South Korean television series
 Confession (miniseries), a 1998 Russian documentary miniseries
 A Confession (TV series), a 2019 British television series
 The Confession (TV series), a 2011 web-series produced by and starring Kiefer Sutherland

Episodes
 "Confession" (Death Note episode), an episode of Death Note
 "Confession" (Law & Order), a 1991 episode of Law & Order
 "The Confession" (Alias), an episode of Alias
 "The Confession" (House), a 2011 episode of House
 "The Confession" (The Borgias), second-season finale episode of the historical drama The Borgias

Other arts, entertainment, and media 
 Confession (radio program), a 1953 summer replacement program for Dragnet on NBC
 Confession album or confession book, a kind of formulaic autograph book

See also 
 Absolution (disambiguation)
 Confess (disambiguation)
 Confessions (disambiguation)
 Confessor (disambiguation)